Xita Church is a Protestant church for the Korean Chinese, located in the Xita area of Heping District, Shenyang, Liaoning Province, China.

History
A brief history is as follows:

 1913, five missionaries of the women's group of the Protestant churches in Uiju, North Pyongan, Korea, arrived.
 1917, the original church (now preserved on the right side of the present-day church) was completed.
 1951, all Korean missionaries went back to Korea.
 1957, Wu Aien became responsible.
 1966–1979, the church was closed during the Cultural Revolution.
 1981, Wu Aien became the pastor.
 1993, the present-day 6-storey church building was dedicated.
 2003, a Chinese-language group was started.

Today
 Address: No. 37, Shifu Dalu, Heping District, Shenyang City, Liaoning Province
 Number of Christians: 3,000

See also
 Christianity and Protestantism
 Christianity in China, Protestantism in China and Three-Self Patriotic Movement
 Dongguan Church and Sacred Heart Cathedral of Shenyang, in Shenyang

References

External links
 Official site (unknown)

Churches in Shenyang
Protestant churches in China